The Alligator Lake is an alpine lake near Whitehorse in southern Yukon, Canada. The Alligator Lake volcanic complex, being in the vicinity, is named after it.

External links
Picture of the Alligator Lake

Lakes of Yukon